Asylum is a BBC Books original novel written by Peter Darvill-Evans and based on the long-running British science fiction television series Doctor Who. It features the Fourth Doctor and Nyssa (resulting in a slight temporal paradox as the Nyssa featured here comes from a time some time after she stopped travelling with the Fifth Doctor).

Plot synopsis
Alfric, the proctor of the Franciscan friary would be otherwise enjoying his life in the town of Oxford in 1278. However, one of his friars is missing and the town is being disrupted by a noblewoman and her traveling companion, a man calling himself 'The Doctor'.

The missing friar turns up dead. Alfric teams up with the two newcomers to solve the mystery. Their efforts lead them to Roger Bacon, a famous scholar who has ties to Nyssa's technographical life.

2001 British novels
2001 science fiction novels
Past Doctor Adventures
Fourth Doctor novels
Novels by Peter Darvill-Evans
Novels set in Oxford